Cefn Fforest is a community and an electoral ward in Caerphilly County Borough, Wales. A wholly urbanized community, it forms the western fringes of the town of Blackwood. By area, it is the smallest of all of the communities of Wales.

Education 
There is a local Primary school located centrally within the community called Cefn Fforest primary School Students who attend Cefn Fforest primary School range in ages from 5 years old to 12 years old.

Cefn Fforest's nearest secondary School is Blackwood Comprehensive Students who attend Blackwood Comprehensive School range in ages from 12 years old to 16 years old.

Notable People 

 Dave (Dai) Fleet, Founder and owner of Abracadabra tattoo parlor
 Dream Alliance, thoroughbred racehorse
 Nathan Cleverly, Welsh former professional boxer

References

Suburbs in Wales
Communities in Caerphilly County Borough